Mesophleps aspina is a moth of the family Gelechiidae. It is found in Thailand and Burma.

The forewings are light yellow, but the basal half of the costa is white.

Etymology
The species name is derived from the Latin prefix a- (meaning absent) and spina (meaning spine) and refers to the absence of the outwardly-directed spines on the posterior margin of the vinculum in the male genitalia which otherwise are characteristic of this albilinella species group.

References

Moths described in 2012
Moths of Asia
aspina